Patrick Alan Roessler (born December 27, 1959 in Phoenix, AZ) is an American professional baseball coach. He is currently the assistant hitting coach for the Washington Nationals. He was formerly the assistant hitting coach for the New York Mets from 2015-2017 & hitting coach in 2018.

Biography

Roessler attended the University of Arizona, and played college baseball for the Arizona Wildcats baseball team. Roessler was a member of the 1980 College World Series champions. He served as the team's captain during his senior year, in 1982.

Roessler served as the hitting coach for the Montreal Expos in 2000 and 2001 Wearing #6. He joined the New York Yankees as their director of player development in 2005, and served in the role until 2014. The Mets hired Pat Roessler as their assistant hitting coach, succeeding Luis Natera, after the 2014 season. Like he did with Montreal, Roessler wore #6 with the Mets. Following the 2017 season and the hiring of manager Mickey Callaway, Roessler was promoted to hitting coach. The Mets and Roessler parted ways as of November 5, 2018. After the 2019 season, the Washington Nationals hired Roessler to be their Assistant Hitting Coach for 2020 where he will wear #66.

References

External links

1959 births
Living people
Arizona Wildcats baseball players
Major League Baseball hitting coaches
Montreal Expos coaches
Pittsburgh Pirates coaches
Houston Astros coaches
New York Mets coaches
New York Yankees executives